Pyrrhias or Pyrrias (Πυρρίας)  may refer to:

Ancient Greece
Pyrrhias of Aetolia, general, late 3rd century BC.
Pyrrhias, Aetolian winner in stadion race, Ancient Olympic Games (200 BC) 
Pyrrhias, a slave character in the comedy Dyskolos by Menander
Pyrrhias, a ferryman of Ithaca in Plutarch's Moralia

Zoology
Benthonellania pyrrhias of Rissoidae (Gastropoda)
Nystiella pyrrhias of Epitoniidae (Wentletrap)
Iophanus pyrrhias of Iophanus, Lycaenidae (butterfly)
Augochlora pyrrhias of Halictidae (Hymenoptera)